Orthocis alnoides is a species of tree-fungus beetle in Ciidae family which can be found throughout Near East and Croatia.

References

Beetles described in 1884
Beetles of Asia
Beetles of Europe
Ciidae